Oddvar Nes (27 December 1938 – 18 September 2016) was a Norwegian linguist.

He became a research assistant at the University of Bergen in 1964, and was promoted to associate professor in 1973 and professor in 1987. His speciality is onomastics. He was a visiting scholar at University of Vienna from 1988 to 1989, and a member of Norwegian Academy of Science and Letters and the Royal Gustavus Adolphus Academy.

He resided in Florvåg.

References

1938 births
2016 deaths
Linguists from Norway
Academic staff of the University of Bergen
Members of the Norwegian Academy of Science and Letters